Arctomia is a genus of lichen-forming fungi in the family Arctomiaceae. The genus was originally circumscribed by Theodor Magnus Fries in 1861. Arctomia has a circumpolar distribution.

Species
Arctomia delicatula 
Arctomia papuanorum 
Arctomia teretiuscula  – China
Arctomia uviformis 

Molecular phylogenetic evidence revealed inappropriate classifications for two species once placed in this genus, A. insignis  and A. borbonica ; they were formally transferred to the genus Gabura in 2020. Arctomia fascicularis   was confirmed to belong to Gabura, a generic placement originally proposed by Per Magnus Jørgensen in 2014.

References

Baeomycetales
Baeomycetales genera
Lichen genera
Taxa named by Theodor Magnus Fries
Taxa described in 1861